The Type 745 Stollergrund-class multi-purpose ship was a class of multi-purpose ships built for the Wehrtechnische Dienststelle 71 (WTD 71) of the German Navy in Eckernförde and the Marinearsenal Wilhelmshaven. Three units are still in use for the WTD 71, the other two boats were sold to the Israeli Navy.

Development 
As a replacement for older test and support vehicles, five small test boats (designation according to the list of ship numbers) were commissioned from Fr. Lürssen Werft as general contractor on October 23, 1987. The 745 class is derived from the Schwedeneck-class and was also built as a subcontract at the Kröger shipyards and the Elsflether shipyards.

The hull is made of steel and divided into eight compartments by seven bulkheads. For better maneuvering, cross-thrust steering systems are installed in the fore and aft. The boats are versatile and take the necessary equipment on board in two containers. Fixed equipment includes a ship's crane and accommodation for embarked personnel.

Ships of class

Citations 

Auxiliary transport ship classes
Auxiliary ships of Germany
Auxiliary ships of the German Navy
Ships of the Israeli Navy